Cap Timm Field is a ballpark located in Ames, Iowa and has been the home of the Iowa State Cyclones baseball program for four decades, a span that includes its time as both a varsity intercollegiate sport and a club sport.  The ballpark is named after former Cyclones baseball coach Cap Timm.

External links

References

Baseball venues in Iowa
College baseball venues in the United States
Iowa State Cyclones baseball
1968 establishments in Iowa
Sports venues completed in 1968
Buildings and structures in Ames, Iowa